Eleei Lalio (born 19 August 1979) is a weightlifter from American Samoa.

Lalio competed at the 2004 Summer Olympics in the heavyweight division, he finished 14th out of the 22 starters.

References

External links
 

1979 births
Living people
American Samoan male weightlifters
American people of Samoan descent
Olympic weightlifters of American Samoa
Weightlifters at the 2004 Summer Olympics